The 1950 Washington State Cougars team represented Washington State University in the 1950 NCAA baseball season. The Cougars played their home games at Bailey Field. The team was coached by Buck Bailey in his 24th season at Washington State.

The Cougars finished second in the College World Series, defeated by the Texas Longhorns in the championship game.

Roster

Schedule and results

Schedule Source:

Awards and honors 
Gordy Brunswick
 First Team All-Pacific Coast Conference

Lee Dolquist
 First Team All-Pacific Coast Conference

Bob McGuire
 First Team All-Pacific Coast Conference

Don Paul
 First Team All-Pacific Coast Conference

References

Washington State Cougars baseball seasons
Washington State Cougars baseball
College World Series seasons
Pac-12 Conference baseball champion seasons
Washington State